RAF Oakley is a former Royal Air Force satellite station between Oakley and Worminghall, Buckinghamshire, England. It was located in a flat, damp wooded area.

History

Second World War usage
Intended as RAF Westcott's satellite, the land at Field Farm had been requisitioned by the War Office, and the airfield built.  RAF Oakley was ready before its parent station so, when it opened on 27 May 1942, it became RAF Bicester's second satellite.  In August 1942 it switched to its intended status and when No. 11 Operational Training Unit RAF moved to Westcott in September 1942, and Oakley became that unit's satellite where it placed some of its Vickers Wellington ICs.

In the Autumn of 1943, Hercules-engined Wellingtons came increasingly into use and the OTU's air gunnery training section was located at Oakley. Conversion training for bomber crews was Oakley's primary role, which continued to the end of the war during the final year of which most personnel were trained for overseas squadrons.

Operation EXODUS

After the end of hostilities in Europe, orders were received on 2 May 1945 that 300 repatriated prisoners of war were arriving by air at 1100.  All arrangements were made for their reception, and the provision of refreshments laid on in the Social Club.  The arrival was, in fact, postponed to later in the day.  Seven Douglas Dakotas landed with repatriated POWs on the following day and more throughout the month, until by the end of May, 72 Dakotas had brought 1,787 PoWs. Operation EXODUS was in full swing and May 1945 was even busier with 443 Avro Lancasters, 103 Dakotas, 51 Handley Page Halifaxes, 31 Consolidated Liberators, 3 Short Stirlings, 3 Lockheed Hudsons, and 2 Boeing Fortresses bringing 15,088 personnel.

Current use
RAF Oakley closed to flying in August 1945, but remains very visibly a wartime airfield, whose main runway remains largely intact with a 'T2' hangar retaining its wartime black finish. Temporary brick wartime buildings stand alongside a 'B1' hangar.

Local people use the runway informally for cycling and running.

The T2 hangar is now gone, it was demolished and a modern industrial complex built in its place, there are however still some buildings nearby that are left and the pole for the windsocks still stands near to the C.O's and O.C flying's homes which are still in use today, and the brick base of the control tower is still in place but as a flat roof storage shed, the rest of the tower is also gone.

On the south east of the airfield, about 100m outside of the perimeter track, is a very well preserved Battle Headquarters building (BHQ). The rooms and corridors inside are all accessible, as is the observation room itself, allowing 360 degree views when the airfield was operational, but now partially obscured by trees. The escape hatch is missing, but the original ladder is still in place, and can still be used to access the roof (August 2020).

In December 2020 a Planning Application was submitted to convert the site into an autonomous vehicle testing facility. This would involve the removal of the main 2000 yard runway, and half of the shorter 1600 yard runway.

Popular culture
 RAF Oakley was the fictional Royal Air Force station in England in the film Pearl Harbor, which was actually filmed at Badminton House.
 A hangar at RAF Oakley was said locally to have been used as a film set in the James Bond film Octopussy in 1983; for the opening sequence (scripted as being in a Latin American country) in Roger Moore's penultimate appearance as Bond the hangar actually used (and blown up) was on the north-western loop dispersal at RAF Northolt, Middlesex.

The hangar, that was supposedly destroyed by a missile in the film, is in fact intact and a warehouse used by Natural Building Technologies, a merchant of building materials.

 However, RAF Oakley was used in the filming of an episode of Midsomer Murders from 2003.

References

External links

WW II Aerodromes of Oxfordshire

Royal Air Force stations in Buckinghamshire
Royal Air Force stations of World War II in the United Kingdom
History of Buckinghamshire